is a Japanese reality television series in the Terrace House franchise. It is the first in the franchise to be co-produced by Fuji TV and Netflix and the first to be released internationally. It premiered on Netflix as a Netflix Original on September 2, 2015, and was also broadcast on Fuji Television in Japan.

Cast

Main cast 

*Age when they first joined Terrace House.

Timeline

Guest appearances

Episodes

Season 1 (2015-16)

References

External links 
 Official website 
 Fuji TV - Terrace House: Boys & Girls in the City 
 Terrace House: Boys & Girls in the City on Netflix
 

Japanese reality television series
Fuji TV original programming
Japanese-language Netflix original programming
Television shows set in Tokyo